Keith Paul William James McAdam DL (born 13 August 1945) is a former Scottish cricketer and a specialist in tropical diseases.

Cricket career
McAdam was a left-handed batsman. He was born in Edinburgh.

McAdam made his first-class debut for Cambridge University against Surrey in 1964. He played 19 further first-class matches for the University, the last coming against Oxford University in 1966. In his 20 first-class matches for the University, he scored 752 runs at a batting average of 19.78, with two half centuries and a highest score of 59. In 1967, he played a single first-class match for the Marylebone Cricket Club at Lord's, making his highest first-class score in the MCC first innings, scoring 63 before being dismissed by Stephen Russell.

McAdam made his debut for Buckinghamshire in the 1966 Minor Counties Championship against Berkshire. He played seven Minor Counties Championship matches for Buckinghamshire between 1966 and 1968. He made his only List A appearance for Buckinghamshire against Middlesex in the 1969 Gillette Cup, scoring one run before being dismissed by John Price.

Education and medical career
McAdam grew up in Uganda, where his father, Sir Ian McAdam, was Professor of Surgery at Makerere University. He attended Prince of Wales School in Nairobi, Millfield School in England, and Clare College, Cambridge, where he studied medicine.

He became an eminent physician, specialising in tropical diseases. He is the founding director of the Infectious Diseases Institute in Kampala, the associate international director at the Royal College of Physicians in London, and is on the International Board of the African Medical and Research Foundation.

He is the founder of the charity "Music for my Mind", which uses music to help dementia patients and a Deputy Lieutenant of Hertfordshire.

References

External links
Keith McAdam at ESPNcricinfo
Keith McAdam at CricketArchive
An interview with Professor Keith McAdam in 2014

1945 births
Living people
Alumni of Nairobi School
People educated at Millfield
Alumni of Clare College, Cambridge
Deputy Lieutenants of Hertfordshire
Cricketers from Edinburgh
Scottish cricketers
Cambridge University cricketers
Buckinghamshire cricketers
Marylebone Cricket Club cricketers
20th-century Scottish medical doctors
21st-century Scottish medical doctors
Scottish medical researchers